Miss World 1959, the 9th edition of the Miss World pageant, was held on 10 November 1959 at the Lyceum Ballroom in London, United Kingdom and was the first to be televised by the BBC. 37 contestants competed for the Miss World. The winner was Corine Rottschäfer, representing Holland. She was crowned by The Chief Barker of the Variety Club of Great Britain.

Results

Contestants

  - Amalia Yolanda Scuffi
  - Helga Knofel
  - Diane Hidalgo
  - Dione Brito Oliveira
  - Huguette Demers
  - Kirsten Olsen
  - Margit Jaatinen
  - Marie Hélène Trové
  - Helga Meyer
  - Star Nyaniba Annan
  - Viola Howells
  - Yakiathi Karaviti
  - Margaret Moani Keala Brumaghim
  - Corine Rottschäfer †
  - Rosemary Lefebre
  - Michelle Mok Ping-Ching
  - Sigurbjörg Sveinsdóttir
  - Fleur Ezekiel
  - Ann Fitzpatrick
  - Ziva Shomrat
  - Paola Falchi
  - Sheila Chong
  - Chieko Ichinose
  - Ufemia Jabaji
  - Seo Jung-ae
  - Josee Pundel
  - Berit Grundvig
  - Elvira dos Santos Encina
  - María Elena Rossel Zapata
  - Maria Teresa Motoa Cardoso
  - Lyllianna Díaz Noya
  - Vivien Lentin
  - Moya Meaker
  - Carola Håkonsson
  - Anne Thelwell
  - Loretta Powell
  - Yvonne Kelly

Notes

Debuts

Returns
Last competed in 1955:
 
Last competed in 1957:

Withdrawals

References

External links
 Miss World official website

 Miss World 1959 video(Dutch)-Corine Rottschäfer

Miss World
1959 in London
1959 beauty pageants
Beauty pageants in the United Kingdom
November 1959 events in the United Kingdom